The Courtney Novels are a series of seventeen novels published between 1964 and 2019 by Wilbur Smith. They chronicle the lives of the Courtney family, from the 1660s through until 1987.  The novels can be split into three parts; the original trilogy of novels follow the twins Sean and Garrick Courtney from the 1860s until 1925.  The second part is five books which follows Centaine de Thiry Courtney, her sons and grandchildren between 1917 and 1987.  The third part, the most recently written, follows the Courtney family from the 1660s through until 1939, focusing on successive generations of the family. There are also two books that follow the third series. As well, there are three additional Courtney books.

Books

The First Sequence 
The first sequence beginning with When the Lion Feeds follows the life of Sean Courtney. Sean and Garrick Courtney are twins who couldn't be more different. The jealous schemes of a woman draw them apart as the nation prepares for war against the Zulu. Sean, believed dead, returns home to find that Garrick has married his pregnant girlfriend.  She wants to be with Sean but when he refuses her she tricks Garrick into thinking Sean raped her, causing Garrick to hate his twin.

Sean places himself in self-exile and wanders the African plains searching for fame. He meets and befriends Duff and they start a gold-mining business together in Johannesburg which makes them rich.  They lose their money to a shady deal and travel the wilderness together where Duff dies after an attack by a rabid jackal. Sean eventually meets a Boer family and marries the daughter. She becomes ill and commits suicide at the end of the book but not before giving birth to a boy, Dirk.

The Sound of Thunder is set several years after the first book.  Sean and his son Dirk finally leave the wilderness and discover that a war is brewing between the British and the Boers. He meets and falls in love with a woman called Ruth and they conceive a daughter during a thunderstorm. Ruth runs away to return to her husband who is a soldier in the Boer War. Later, Sean wins many victories in the war and befriends Saul, Ruth's husband. The commander of the Boers is none other than Sean's old brother-in-law, Jan Paulus Leroux. They fight but decide to leave each other alone. Saul is killed in battle and Sean, although feeling unnecessarily guilty, finds Ruth and marries her. Sean's daughter, named Storm, grows to be pretty and bright but Sean's first-born, Dirk, has become evil with jealousy for his father's attention. The book ends with Sean's brother Garrick forgiving him and Dirk running away, promising to ruin the Courtneys.

A Sparrow Falls is the concluding part of Sean Courtney's life story. It begins with a young soldier named Mark Anders being sent out to kill a German sniper in the First World War. Sean admires him and offers him a job. Mark returns home to find his land taken and his grandfather murdered. He investigates and discovers that Dirk Courtney is trying to build a dam that would cover a massive area including his stolen land. Father and son clash and Dirk swears to kill Sean. Mark falls in love with Sean's daughter, Storm. The book describes vividly how South Africa was moving towards a tumultuous civil war. In the book's climax, Dirk brutally kills Sean and Ruth but is then killed by Mark. Mark regains his land and becomes the warden and lives with Storm in relative peace and happiness.

The Second Sequence 
The second sequence of Courtney novels begins with The Burning Shore. It follows Michael, the first-born, illegitimate son of Sean Courtney and his exploits as a pilot during World War I in Europe. Michael meets and falls in love with Centaine de Thiry, a Frenchwoman, and in a night of stolen passion they conceive a baby. Before Centaine discovers she is pregnant, Michael asks Centaine to marry him and takes her to meet his 'Uncle' Sean, who is biologically his father. Michael is killed on their wedding day, before the ceremony takes place, and Centaine goes to Sean for help. Consumed with grief for his unacknowledged first-born son, Sean sends Centaine and her nurse, Anna, to his brother Garrick in South Africa. However the Hospital Ship they are traveling on is torpedoed by a German submarine and Centaine is shipwrecked, alone and pregnant, on the coast of South West Africa. Only through her incredible determination to live for the sake of Michael's unborn son does Centaine survive, and eventually she is adopted by an old San (Bushmen) couple who teach her the language and the ways of the Kalahari Desert. They also take her to 'The Place of All Life', a San Holy Place, where Centaine discovers a beautiful stone. After the birth of her son who she names Michael Shasa Courtney, Centaine is tracked down by a German South African, Lothar De La Rey, a renegade outlaw who has demanded Garrick trade the safe delivery of Centaine and her child for a free pardon. Lonely and deprived of contact with her own kind, Centaine falls in love with Lothar and conceives him a child in the desert. After she discovers that Lothar murdered H'ani and O'wa, her adopted San family, Centaine turns on Lothar and insists he take the baby from the child-bed and that she never wants to see Lothar or their bastard child again. While hiding in the desert awaiting the child's birth, Centaine pegs out and lays mining claims on the 'Place of All Life', guided by the promise in the glittering stone she found years before. Upon returning to the colony, Centaine and Shasa are accepted into the Courtney family and the fact she and Michael Courtney never legally married remains a closely guarded a secret, as well as the maternity of Lothar De La Rey's son. The newly named H'ani Diamond Mine makes Centaine Courtney one of the richest women in the world.

The second sequence continues through four more books following the exploits of the Courtneys:

Power of the Sword focuses on the lives of Centaine de Thiry Courtney's sons — Shasa Courtney and Manfred De La Rey —  caught up in South Africa's tumultuous history through almost two decades. The two are unaware that they are half-brothers and are on opposing sides of South Africa's white community. The story opens in the days of the depression, with Centaine Courtney fighting to keep her mine and her company afloat financially competing against the dominance of the De Beers diamond company and their set diamond selling quotas. In the process of saving her company, Centaine ruins the lives of Lothar De La Ray and her unacknowledged son Manfred. From their first meeting, the two young boys, Manfred and Shasa, recognize in each other that they have intertwined destinies. From schoolboys days their lives are glaringly different, Shasa spends his early years in the affluent British South African world of private schools, polo ponies and a luxurious family estate, Weltevreden, while Lothar spends them in the squatter camps of the unemployed and impoverished. After Lothar De La Rey executes a daring raid on Centaine's diamonds, which goes horribly wrong, Lothar is jailed and Manfred is sent to live with his Uncle Tromp Bierman, a well known and much respected Minister of the Dutch Reformed Church. With the training of his uncle Tromp, Manfred becomes a champion boxer. He becomes a firm believer in the superiority and the divine right of his people, the Afrikaner, to the Promised Land of South Africa. He joins the Ossewa Brandwag, a Nazi-Supporting Secret Society for elite so-called pure-blooded Afrikaners who have one objective - to raise the interests of the Afrikaner people above all others. Both Shasa and Manfred are included in the South African team in the 1936 Olympics in Hitler's Berlin and there Manfred discovers his true calling. He marries Heidi, a German Intelligence Officer, and becomes a formidable secret agent dubbed 'White Sword.' His mission is to assassinate the Prime Minister of South Africa, and leave the country ripe for revolution but a simple mistake destroys the plan (he killed Garrick Courtney) and the pathways of destiny for Shasa and Manfred cross once again. Meanwhile, in the mines and native labour camps across South Africa, the black workers grow dissatisfied with the conditions of their lives and unions are formed. Led by the ruthless half brothers Moses Gama and Hendrik Tabaka, as well as other revolutionaries such as Nelson Mandela and Louis Botha, The ANC (African National Congress) begins to grow in power and influence and spreads its arms across the troubled nation.

In Rage It is 1952 and in the wake of World War II, South Africa enters a new political era. The seeds of apartheid have been sown and the restlessness of the Black tribes is growing. Shasa Courtney and Manfred De La Ray, unacknowledged half brothers who have grown up in different worlds in the same country, are both heavily involved in the political arena on opposite sides. Early in the book, Manfred De La Rey discovers the circumstances surrounding Shasa's illegitimate birth, and subsequently uncovers the truth of his own maternity. Politically, the National Party, of which Manfred De La Rey is a minister, is now in power in South Africa. In the interest of political gain, the party reaches out to Shasa Courtney and lures him to their side with the one bait that Shasa cannot resist... A Ministerial post and the promise and power the position will bring. However, under the noses of the white administration of the country, the ANC has formed a military wing, 'Umkhonto we Sizwe'or 'The Spear of The Nation,' and guided by the ruthless half brothers Moses Gama and Hendrik Tabaka, begins to shake the very foundations of apartheid. Moses Gama, in his determination to seize control of the country by blood shed and revolution, seduces Tara Courtney, Shasa's wife, and unbeknownst to Shasa, skillfully turns her into an instrument of the struggle, spying on her husband and her father, both powerful men. Tara even bears Moses a son, Benjamin Afrika, in secret. With Tara's assistance, Moses puts into play a plan to destroy the government, the Prime Minister and the policy of apartheid in the most brutal way possible. Only the cunning and insight of Shasa Courtney, and his new ally Manfred De La Rey, stops the plan with minimum blood shed, but the rage of the people is burning and rage is a powerful thing. Shasa discovers that Manfred killed Garrick Courtney In a dramatic end, Manfred dies in his country house.

Golden Fox (set in 1969) focuses on Isabella Courtney, the youngest child and only daughter of Shasa and Tara Courtney. Isabella and Shasa are living in London, where Shasa is the ambassador for South Africa. In what is, unknown to Isabella, a carefully planned operation, Bella is drawn into the trap of the handsome and dashing Ramon, the 'Golden Fox'. On the surface an exiled Spanish nobleman but in reality a close relative of Fidel Castro and a KGB operative. Just like her mother, Isabella is seduced and impregnated by Ramon, and shortly after the birth of her son Nicholas, Ramon and the baby disappear. Shortly afterwards, Isabella is shown a video of her son being tortured, and is told he will continue to be tortured, mutilated and eventually murdered, if she doesn't co-operate. Torn between love for her son and loyalty to her country, Isabella becomes a traitoress, drawn into the KGB plot against her will and forced to spy on her father, now heavily involved in Armscor, which is developing nuclear weapons as well as a deadly nerve agent for use in the South African Border War. With the promise of access to her son, Isabella delivers all of the details of her country's most secret activities to their bitter enemies. Eventually her betrayal is discovered and the full resources of the Courtney empire including Isabella's now famous brother Sean, one of the top commanders in the Rhodesian army, are thrown into the rescue of young Nicolas and delivery of him safe into the arms of his great grandmother Centaine De Thiry Courtney. 
 
A Time To Die (set in 1987) is focused on Sean Courtney Jnr, Eldest son of Shasa Courtney and a veteran of the Rhodesian anti-guerilla war who has turned into a professional hunter. The dying wish of an old friend and client draws him to follow a legendary elephant into Mozambique accompanied by his friend's beautiful and spirited daughter Claudia. However Claudia is captured by Renamo, the anti government forces, and Sean is forced to co-operate with them to save the life of the woman he has fallen in love with. The former Zimbabwean guerrilla in charge of the regiment, General China, is a hard and ruthless man who is determined to win power of the shattered country. Only one thing stands in his way- the newly acquired Hind Helicopter fleet of the Frelimo government threatens to wipe out the Renamo rebels. One thing alone can penetrate the defenses of the titanium plated aircraft and Sean is sent into Zimbabwe to steal a shipment of Stinger Missiles to deliver to China. This leads to a violent conflict between the warring Renamo and Frelimo, with Sean and Claudia caught in the middle and desperately trying to escape to South Africa.

The Third Sequence
The third sequence is set between the late-17th and the early-19th century, each book laying focus on succeeding generations of the Courtneys.

Birds of Prey begins with the Anglo-Dutch naval war drawing to a close. Sir Francis Courtney, Master Navigator of the Order of St George and The Holy Grail and his son, Henry (Hal) sail off the coast of southern Africa waiting for a Dutch galleon which they soon take over. Francis is betrayed by a brother knight, and they are captured and imprisoned by the Dutch. Sir Francis is publicly executed in front of Hal. The rest of the crew escape after a year of hard labour and make Hal their captain, and he sets off to avenge his father's death. Along the way he must deal with dangers such as war and the man responsible for his father's death. By the end of the book, he becomes a Knight and a Privateer and assists the ruler of Ethiopia, Prester John in repelling Arab invaders.

Monsoon follows the adventures of Hal's sons, William, Tom, Guy and Dorian. An Arab Corsair is ambushing merchant and war ships in the Indian Ocean and the English send Hal to contest him. The twin brothers, Tom and Guy, fall out over a woman and Guy leaves for India while William remains home in England. Dorian is captured by slavers and sold to the Prince of Oman, al-Malik, who adopts him as his son. There he meets Yasmini, one of the many daughters of the Prince. They fall in love and Dorian saves her from Zayn al-Din, another of the Prince's sons. Eventually Dorian (known as al-Salil, The Drawn Sword) and Yasmini run away, damned for committing incest. Many years of searching leave Tom tired of battle but by chance he faces Dorian in battle and almost kills him. Recognizing each other, they reunite and escape to Africa.

Blue Horizon follows the adventures of Tom's son Jim, and Dorian's son, Mansur. Living in the Cape of Good Hope, Jim rescues Louisa, a prisoner of the Dutch East India Company, whom he falls in love with and together they escape across Africa while being pursued by the colonial authorities. Meanwhile, Tom, Dorian and their entourage escape Good Hope to avoid retribution for Jim's escape. Once escaped they settle, where Dorian's wife Yasmini is assassinated and this leads to him reclaiming his place as Caliph of Oman with Mansur by his side. They fight in a civil war against Zayn al-Din, who took the throne after al-Malik's death and ruled with an iron fist.

Triumph of the Sun is the fourth book of this sequence. 'It is 1884, and in the Sudan, decades of brutal misgovernment by the ruling Egyptian Khedive in Cairo precipitates a bloody rebellion and Holy War. The charismatic new religious leader, the Mahdi or "Expected One", has gathered his forces of Arab warlords in preparation for a siege on the city of Khartoum. The British are forced to intervene to protect their national interests and to attempt to rescue the hundreds of British subjects stranded in the city. British trader and businessman Ryder Courtney is trapped in the capital city of Khartoum under the orders of the iron-willed General Charles George Gordon. It is here that he meets skilled soldier and swordsman Captain Penrod Ballantyne of the 10th Hussars and the British Consul, David Benbrook, as well as Benbrook's three beautiful daughters. Against the vivid and bloody backdrop of the Arabs’ fierce and merciless siege these three powerful men must fight to survive. It is in this book that Smith establishes the link between the earlier and later Courtney novels, by revealing that Ryder Courtney is the brother of Waite Courtney, father of twins Sean and Garrick. At one point Ryder considers investing in his nephew Sean's Gold Mine.

Assegai is the fifth book of this sequence. In 1913 Leon Courtney, an ex-soldier turned professional hunter in British East Africa, guides rich and powerful men from America and Europe on big game safaris in the territories of the Maasai tribe. Leon has developed a special relationship with the Maasai. One of Leon's clients is Otto von Meerbach, a German industrialist whose company builds aircraft and vehicles for the Kaiser's burgeoning army. Leon is recruited by his uncle Penrod Ballantyne (from The Triumph of the Sun) who is commander of the British forces in East Africa to gather information from Otto von Meerbach. Instead Leon falls desperately in love with Otto von Meerbach"s beautiful and enigmatic mistress, Eva Von Wellberg. Just after the outbreak of World War I Leon stumbles on a plot by Otto von Meerbach to raise a rebellion against Britain on the side of Germany amongst the disenchanted survivors of the Boer War in South Africa. He finds himself left alone to frustrate Otto von Meerbach's design. Then Eva Von Wellberg returns to Africa with her master and Leon finds out who and what she really is behind the mask...

Chronological order
The Courtney series can be split into three parts, each part following a particular era of the Courtney family.

In chronological order it goes the Third Sequence, First Sequence, then the Second Sequence.
However this is a slight generalization, so in fact the book sequence is:
 Birds of Prey 1660s (Birds of Prey series)
 Golden Lion 1670s
 Monsoon 1690s (Birds of Prey series)
 The Tiger's Prey 1700s
 Blue Horizon 1730s (Birds of Prey series)
 Ghost Fire 1754
 Storm Tide 1774
 When the Lion Feeds 1860s-1890s (When the Lion Feeds Series)
 Triumph of the Sun 1880s (Courtney and Ballantyne)
 King of Kings 1887 (Courtney and Ballantyne)
 The Sound of Thunder 1899-1906 (When the Lion Feeds Series)
 Assegai 1906-1918 (Assegai series)
 The Burning Shore 1917-1920 (The Burning Shore Series)
 War Cry 1918-1939 (Assegai series)
 A Sparrow Falls 1918-1925 (When the Lion Feeds Series)
 Power of the Sword 1931-1948 (The Burning Shore series)
 Courtney's War 1939 (Assegai series)
 Rage 1950s and 1960s (The Burning Shore series)
 Legacy of War After WWII (Assegai series)
 Golden Fox 1969-1979 (The Burning Shore series)
 A Time To Die 1987 (The Burning Shore series)

Main characters
Anders, Mark - soldier who becomes protégé of Sean Courtney. Later marries Storm Courtney and becomes a game warden.
Courtney, Dirk (1890-1925) - son of Sean Courtney and Katrina Leroux. Dirk was jealous of his brother Michael. Died after being responsible for the death of his father and step mother.
Courtney, Michael (d 1917) - eldest son of Sean Courtney. Dies during World War One. Father of Shasa Courtney.
Courtney, Sean (1860 -1925) - big game hunter, soldier. Married Afrikaaner, Katrina Leroux and they had a son, Dirk. Katrina died and Sean married Ruth, the widow of his best friend Saul. They had a daughter, Storm. He and Ruth were killed in an accident engineered by Dirk.

References
General

Specific

Book series introduced in 1964
Apartheid novels
Novels set during the South African Border War
Novels set in South Africa
Novels set in Rhodesia
Novels set in Zimbabwe
Novel series
Novels by Wilbur Smith
Family saga novels
Africa in fiction
Novels set in the 1980s
Novels set in the 1910s
Novels set in the 1950s
Novels set in the 17th century